Qin Xiaozhu (died 385 BC), was the duchess consort of Duke Hui II of Qin. She served as regent of the Chinese Duchy of Qin during the minority of her son Chuzi II between 387–385 BC. 

She and her son were deposed and killed by the minister Jun Gai (菌改), who placed Duke Xian of Qin (424–362 BC) on the throne.

Issue
 Chuzi II

References 

5th-century BC births
385 BC deaths
4th-century BC Chinese women
4th-century BC Chinese people
4th-century BC women rulers
Qin royal consorts